(also Il,  ʾīlu;  ʾīl;  ʾēl;  ʾīyl;   or  ; cognate to ) is a Northwest Semitic word meaning "god" or "deity", or referring (as a proper name) to any one of multiple major ancient Near Eastern deities. A rarer form, ila, represents the predicate form in Old Akkadian and in Amorite. The word is derived from the Proto-Semitic *ʔil-, meaning "god".

Specific deities known as El, Al  or Il include the supreme god of the ancient Canaanite religion and the supreme god of East Semitic speakers in Mesopotamia's Early Dynastic Period. Among the Hittites, El was known as Elkunirsa.

Linguistic forms and meanings
Cognate forms of ʼĒl are found throughout the Semitic languages. They include Ugaritic , pl. ; Phoenician  pl. ; Hebrew , pl. ; Aramaic ; Akkadian , pl. .

In northwest Semitic use, ʼĒl was a generic word for any god as well as the special name or title of a particular god who was distinguished from other gods as being "the god". ʼĒl is listed at the head of many pantheons. In some Canaanite and Ugaritic sources, ʼĒl played a role as father of the gods, of creation, or both. 

However, because the word ʼĒl sometimes refers to a god other than the great god ʼĒl, it is frequently ambiguous as to whether ʼĒl followed by another name means the great god ʼĒl with a particular epithet applied or refers to another god entirely. For example, in the Ugaritic texts, ʾil mlk is understood to mean "ʼĒl the King" but ʾil hd as "the god Hadad".

The Semitic root ʾlh (Arabic , Aramaic ʾAlāh, ʾElāh, Hebrew ʾelōah) may be ʾl with a parasitic h, and ʾl may be an abbreviated form of ʾlh. In the Hebrew texts this word is interpreted as being semantically singular for "god" by biblical commentators. However the documentary hypothesis developed originally in the 1870s, identifies these that different authors – the Jahwist, Elohist, Deuteronomist, and the Priestly source – were responsible for editing stories from a polytheistic religion into those of a monotheistic religion. Inconsistencies that arise between monotheism and polytheism in the texts are reflective of this hypothesis.

The stem ʾl is found prominently in the earliest strata of east Semitic, northwest Semitic, and south Semitic groups. Personal names including the stem ʾl are found with similar patterns in both Amorite and Sabaic.

Proto-Sinaitic, Phoenician, Aramaic, and Hittite texts
The Egyptian god Ptah is given the title ḏū gitti 'Lord of Gath' in a prism from Tel Lachish which has on its opposite face the name of Amenhotep II (c. 1435–1420 BCE). The title ḏū gitti is also found in Serābitṭ text 353. Cross (1973, p. 19) points out that Ptah is often called the Lord (or one) of eternity and thinks it may be this identification of ʼĒl with Ptah that lead to the epithet olam 'eternal' being applied to ʼĒl so early and so consistently. (However, in the Ugaritic texts, Ptah is seemingly identified rather with the craftsman god Kothar-wa-Khasis.) Yet another connection is seen with the Mandaean angel Ptahil, whose name combines both the terms Ptah and Il. 

In an inscription in the Proto-Sinaitic script, William F. Albright transcribed the phrase ʾL Ḏ ʿLM, which he translated as the appellation "El, (god) of eternity".

The name Raphael or Rapha-El, meaning 'God has healed' in Ugarit, is attested to in approximately 1350 BCE in one of the Amarna Letters EA333, found in Tell-el-Hesi from the ruler of Lachish to 'The Great One' 

A Phoenician inscribed amulet of the seventh century BCE from Arslan Tash may refer to ʼĒl. The text was translated by Rosenthal (1969, p. 658) as follows:

However, Cross (1973, p. 17) translated the text as follows:

In some inscriptions, the name Ēl qōne 'arṣ (Punic: 𐤀𐤋 𐤒𐤍 𐤀𐤓𐤑 ʾl qn ʾrṣ) meaning "ʼĒl creator of Earth" appears, even including a late inscription at Leptis Magna in Tripolitania dating to the second century. In Hittite texts, the expression becomes the single name Ilkunirsa, this Ilkunirsa appearing as the husband of Asherdu (Asherah) and father of 77 or 88 sons.

In a Hurrian hymn to ʼĒl (published in Ugaritica V, text RS 24.278), he is called il brt and il dn, which Cross (p. 39) takes as 'ʼĒl of the covenant' and 'ʼĒl the judge' respectively.

Ugarit and the Levant
For the Canaanites and the ancient Levantine region as a whole, ʼĒl or ʼIl was the supreme god, the father of mankind and all creatures. He also fathered many gods, most importantly Baal, Yam, and Mot, each sharing similar attributes to the Greco-Roman gods: Zeus, Poseidon, and Hades respectively.

As recorded on the clay tablets of Ugarit, El is the husband of the goddess Asherah.

Three pantheon lists found at Ugarit (modern —, Syria) begin with the four gods il-'ib (which according to Cross; is the name of a generic kind of deity, perhaps the divine ancestor of the people), ʼĒl, Dagnu (that is Dagon), and Ba'l Ṣapān (that is the god Haddu or Hadad). Though Ugarit had a large temple dedicated to Dagon and another to Hadad, there was no temple dedicated to ʼĒl.

ʼĒl is called again and again Tôru ʼĒl ("Bull ʼĒl" or "the bull god"). He is bātnyu binwāti ("Creator of creatures"), abū banī 'ili ("father of the gods"), and  'abū 'adami ("father of man"). He is qāniyunu 'ôlam ("creator eternal"), the epithet 'ôlam appearing in Hebrew form in the Hebrew name of God ēl 'ôlam "God Eternal" in Genesis 21.33. He is ḥātikuka ("your patriarch"). ʼĒl is the grey-bearded ancient one, full of wisdom, malku ("King"), abū šamīma ("Father of years"), El gibbōr ("ʼĒl the warrior"). He is also named lṭpn of unknown meaning, variously rendered as Latpan, Latipan, or Lutpani ("shroud-face" by Strong's Hebrew Concordance), c.f. cognate with Arabic لطيف Latif "hidden".

"El" (Father of Heaven / Saturn) and his major son: "Hadad" (Father of Earth / Jupiter), are symbolized both by the bull, and both wear bull horns on their headdresses.

In Canaanite mythology, El builds a desert sanctuary with his children and his two wives, leading to speculation  that at one point El was a desert god.

The mysterious Ugaritic text Shachar and Shalim tells how (perhaps near the beginning of all things) ʼĒl came to shores of the sea and saw two women who bobbed up and down. ʼĒl was sexually aroused and took the two with him, killed a bird by throwing a staff at it, and roasted it over a fire. He asked the women to tell him when the bird was fully cooked, and to then address him either as husband or as father, for he would thenceforward behave to them as they called him. They saluted him as husband. He then lay with them, and they gave birth to Shachar ("Dawn") and Shalim ("Dusk"). Again ʼĒl lay with his wives and the wives gave birth to "the gracious gods", "cleavers of the sea", "children of the sea". The names of these wives are not explicitly provided, but some confusing rubrics at the beginning of the account mention the goddess Athirat, who is otherwise ʼĒl's chief wife, and the goddess Raḥmayyu ("the one of the womb"), otherwise unknown.

In the Ugaritic Ba'al cycle, ʼĒl is introduced dwelling on (or in) Mount Lel (Lel possibly meaning "Night") at the fountains of the two rivers at the spring of the two deeps. He dwells in a tent according to some interpretations of the text which may explain why he had no temple in Ugarit. As to the rivers and the spring of the two deeps, these might refer to real streams, or to the mythological sources of the salt water ocean and the fresh water sources under the earth, or to the waters above the heavens and the waters beneath the earth.

In the episode of the "Palace of Ba'al", the god Ba'al Hadad invites the "seventy sons of Athirat" to a feast in his new palace. Presumably these sons have been fathered on Athirat by ʼĒl; in following passages they seem to be the gods (ilm) in general or at least a large portion of them. The only sons of ʼĒl named individually in the Ugaritic texts are Yamm ("Sea"), Mot ("Death"), and Ashtar, who may be the chief and leader of most of the sons of ʼĒl. Ba'al Hadad is a few times called ʼĒl's son rather than the son of Dagan as he is normally called, possibly because ʼĒl is in the position of a clan-father to all the gods.

The fragmentary text R.S. 24.258 describes a banquet to which ʼĒl invites the other gods and then disgraces himself by becoming outrageously drunk and passing out after confronting an otherwise unknown Hubbay, "he with the horns and tail".  The text ends with an incantation for the cure of some disease, possibly hangover.

Hebrew Bible
The Hebrew form (אל) appears in Latin letters in Standard Hebrew transcription as El and in Tiberian Hebrew transcription as ʾĒl. ʼĒl is a generic word for god that could be used for any god, including Hadad, Moloch, or Yahweh.

In the Tanakh, 'elōhîm is the normal word for a god or the great God (or gods, given that the 'im' suffix makes a word plural in Hebrew). But the form El also appears, mostly in poetic passages and in the patriarchal narratives attributed to the Priestly source of the documentary hypothesis. It occurs 217 times in the Masoretic Text: seventy-three times in the Psalms and fifty-five times in the Book of Job, and otherwise mostly in poetic passages or passages written in elevated prose. It occasionally appears with the definite article as hā'Ēl 'the god' (for example in ).

The theological position of the Tanakh is that the names ʼĒl and Ĕlōhîm, when used in the singular to mean the supreme god, refer to Yahweh, beside whom other gods are supposed to be either nonexistent or insignificant. Whether this was a long-standing belief or a relatively new one has long been the subject of inconclusive scholarly debate about the prehistory of the sources of the Tanakh and about the prehistory of Israelite religion. In the P strand,  may be translated:
I revealed myself to Abraham, to Isaac, and to Jacob as Ēl Shaddāi, but was not known to them by my name, YHVH.

However, it is said in  that Abraham accepted the blessing of El, when Melchizedek, the king of Salem and high priest of its deity El Elyon blessed him. One scholarly position is that the identification of Yahweh with ʼĒl is late, that Yahweh was earlier thought of as only one of many gods, and not normally identified with ʼĒl. Another is that in much of the Hebrew Bible the name El is an alternative name for Yahweh, but in the Elohist and Priestly traditions it is considered an earlier name than Yahweh.
Mark Smith has argued that Yahweh and El were originally separate, but were considered synonymous from very early on.

The slaying of the serpent in myth is a deed attributed to both Ba'al Hadad and 'Anat in the Ugaritic texts, but not to ʼĒl.

Such mythological motifs are variously seen as late survivals from a period when Yahweh held a place in theology comparable to that of Hadad at Ugarit; or as late henotheistic/monotheistic applications to Yahweh of deeds more commonly attributed to Hadad; or simply as examples of eclectic application of the same motifs and imagery to various different gods. Similarly, it is argued inconclusively whether Ēl Shaddāi, Ēl 'Ôlām, Ēl 'Elyôn, and so forth, were originally understood as separate divinities. Albrecht Alt presented his theories on the original differences of such gods in Der Gott der Väter in 1929.
But others have argued that from patriarchal times, these different names were in fact generally understood to refer to the same single great god, ʼĒl. This is the position of Frank Moore Cross (1973). What is certain is that the form 'El does appear in Israelite names from every period including the name Yiśrā'ēl ("Israel"), meaning "El strives".

According to The Oxford Companion to World Mythology,
It seems almost certain that the God of the Jews evolved gradually from the Canaanite El, who was in all likelihood the "God of Abraham" ... If El was the high God of Abraham—Elohim, the prototype of Yahveh—Asherah was his wife, and there are archaeological indications that she was perceived as such before she was in effect "divorced" in the context of emerging Judaism of the 7th century BCE. (See .)

The apparent plural form Ēlîm or Ēlim "gods" occurs only four times in the Tanakh. Psalm 29, understood as an enthronement psalm, begins:

Psalm 89:6 (verse 7 in Hebrew) has:

Traditionally bênê 'ēlîm has been interpreted as 'sons of the mighty', 'mighty ones', for El can mean 'mighty', though such use may be metaphorical (compare the English expression [by] God awful). It is possible also that the expression ēlîm in both places descends from an archaic stock phrase in which lm was a singular form with the m-enclitic and therefore to be translated as 'sons of ʼĒl'. The m-enclitic appears elsewhere in the Tanakh and in other Semitic languages. Its meaning is unknown, possibly simply emphasis. It appears in similar contexts in Ugaritic texts where the expression bn 'il alternates with bn 'ilm, but both must mean 'sons of ʼĒl'. That phrase with m-enclitic also appears in Phoenician inscriptions as late as the fifth century BCE.

One of the other two occurrences in the Tanakh is in the "Song of Moses", :

Who is like you among the Gods (ēlim), Yahweh?

The final occurrence is in :

And the king will do according to his pleasure; and he will exalt himself and magnify himself over every god (ēl), and against the God of Gods (El 'Elîm) he will speak outrageous things, and will prosper until the indignation is accomplished: for that which is decided will be done.

There are a few cases in the Tanakh where some think El referring to the great god ʼĒl is not equated with Yahweh.

Son of man, say to the prince of Tyre: "Thus says the Lord Yahweh: 'Because your heart is proud and you have said: "I am ēl (god), in the seat of elōhîm (gods), I am enthroned in the middle of the seas." Yet you are man and not El even though you have made your heart like the heart of elōhîm ('gods').

Here ēl might refer to a generic god, or to a highest god, ʼĒl.  When viewed as applying to the King of Tyre specifically, the king was probably not thinking of Yahweh.  When viewed as a general taunt against anyone making divine claims, it may or may not refer to Yahweh depending on the context.

In  we find Ēl Bêrît 'God of the Covenant', seemingly the same as the Ba'al Bêrît 'Lord of the Covenant' whose worship has been condemned a few verses earlier. See Baal for a discussion of this passage.

 says:

This could mean that Yahweh judges along with many other gods as one of the council of the high god ʼĒl. However it can also mean that Yahweh stands in the Divine Council (generally known as the Council of ʼĒl), as ʼĒl judging among the other members of the council. The following verses in which the god condemns those whom he says were previously named gods (Elohim) and sons of the Most High suggest the god here is in fact ʼĒl judging the lesser gods.

The phrase also occurs in the Pyrgi Inscription as hkkbm 'l (preceded by the definite article h and followed by the m-enclitic).

Sanchuniathon
Philo of Byblos (c. 64–141 AD) was a Greek writer whose account Sanchuniathon survives in quotation by Eusebius and may contain the major surviving traces of Phoenician mythology. ʼĒl (rendered Elus or called by his standard Greek counterpart Cronus) is not the creator god or first god. ʼĒl is rather the son of Sky (Uranus) and Earth (Ge). Sky and Earth are themselves children of 'Elyôn 'Most High'. ʼĒl is brother to the God Bethel, to Dagon and to an unknown god, equated with the Greek Atlas and to the goddesses Aphrodite/'Ashtart, Rhea (presumably Asherah), and Dione (equated with Ba'alat Gebal). ʼĒl is the father of Persephone and of Athena (presumably the goddess 'Anat).

Sky and Earth have separated from one another in hostility, but Sky insists on continuing to force himself on Earth and attempts to destroy the children born of such unions. At last, with the advice of his daughter Athena and the god Hermes Trismegistus (perhaps Thoth), ʼĒl successfully attacks his father Sky with a sickle and spear of iron. He and his military allies the Eloim gain Sky's kingdom.

In a later passage it is explained that ʼĒl castrated Sky. One of Sky's concubines (who was given to ʼĒl's brother Dagon) was already pregnant by Sky. The son who is born of the union, called Demarûs or Zeus, but once called Adodus, is obviously Hadad, the Ba'al of the Ugaritic texts who now becomes an ally of his grandfather Sky and begins to make war on ʼĒl.

ʼĒl has three wives, his sisters or half-sisters Aphrodite/Astarte ('Ashtart), Rhea (presumably Asherah), and Dione (identified by Sanchuniathon with Ba'alat Gebal the tutelary goddess of Byblos, a city which Sanchuniathon says that ʼĒl founded).

El is depicted primarily as a warrior; in Ugaritic sources Baal has the warrior role and El is peaceful, and it may be that the Sanchuniathon depicts an earlier tradition that was more preserved in the southern regions of Canaan.

Eusebius, through whom the Sanchuniathon is preserved, is not interested in setting the work forth completely or in order. But we are told that ʼĒl slew his own son Sadidus (a name that some commentators think might be a corruption of Shaddai, one of the epithets of the Biblical ʼĒl) and that ʼĒl also beheaded one of his daughters. Later, perhaps referring to this same death of Sadidus we are told:

A fuller account of the sacrifice appears later:

The account also relates that Thoth:

This is the form under which ʼĒl/Cronus appears on coins from Byblos from the reign of Antiochus IV Epiphanes (175–164 BCE) four spread wings and two folded wings, leaning on a staff. Such images continued to appear on coins until after the time of Augustus.

Poseidon

A bilingual inscription from Palmyra dated to the 1st century equates ʼĒl-Creator-of-the-Earth with the Greek god Poseidon. Going back to the 8th century BCE, the bilingual inscription at Karatepe in the Taurus Mountains equates ʼĒl-Creator-of-the-Earth to Luwian hieroglyphs read as da-a-ś, this being the Luwian form of the name of the Babylonian water god Ea, lord of the abyss of water under the earth. (This inscription lists ʼĒl in second place in the local pantheon, following Ba'al Shamîm and preceding the Eternal Sun.)

Poseidon is known to have been worshipped in Beirut, his image appearing on coins from that city. Poseidon of Beirut was also worshipped at Delos where there was an association of merchants, shipmasters, and warehousemen called the Poseidoniastae of Berytus founded in 110 or 109 BCE. Three of the four chapels at its headquarters on the hill northwest of the Sacred Lake were dedicated to Poseidon, the Tyche of the city equated with Astarte (that is 'Ashtart), and to Eshmun.

Also at Delos, that association of Tyrians, though mostly devoted to Heracles-Melqart, elected a member to bear a crown every year when sacrifices to Poseidon took place. A banker named Philostratus donated two altars, one to Palaistine Aphrodite Urania ('Ashtart) and one to Poseidon "of Ascalon".

Though Sanchuniathon distinguishes Poseidon from his Elus/Cronus, this might be a splitting off of a particular aspect of ʼĒl in a euhemeristic account. Identification of an aspect of ʼĒl with Poseidon rather than with Cronus might have been felt to better fit with Hellenistic religious practice, if indeed this Phoenician Poseidon really is the ʼĒl who dwells at the source of the two deeps in Ugaritic texts. More information is needed to be certain.

See also

 Elagabalus (deity)
 Al (folklore)
 Allah
 Ancient Semitic religion
 Anu
 Enlil
 Names of God in Judaism
 Theophory in the Bible

Footnotes

References

.

Further reading

External links

 Bartleby: American Heritage Dictionary: Semitic Roots: ʾl
 Pronunciation (audio) of El

 
Baal
Creator gods
Deities in the Hebrew Bible
God
Hebrew words and phrases in the Hebrew Bible
Levantine mythology
Names of God in Christianity
Names of God in Judaism
Phoenician mythology
Sky and weather gods
Ugaritic deities
West Semitic gods
Cattle in religion
Cattle deities
Horned gods